Ghulam Haidar Khan High School is an all-boys school located in Khair Khana, Kabul, Afghanistan. The school is named after Afghan Prince Ghulam Haidar Khan, son of Emir Dost Mohammad Khan, who fought against the British forces in the July 1839 Battle of Ghazni during the First Anglo-Afghan War. It has about 10,000 students from seven to twelfth grade in four shifts.

History 
The original school name was "Saboor e Shaheed" when the school built until after the Dr. Najeebullah's government 1992.

Displaced families were accommodated in the school in the 1990s.

Staff 
Asadullah Kohistani - Principal 
Mashooq Khan, chemistry teacher and also the science laborant 
Ali sina Mustafa, assistant Principal
Fazel Rahman Fazel, assistant Principal
Khal Mohammad Shejaye  assistant Principal
Agha Sahib, assistant Principal
Esmat Subhani, Lecturer - English Language
Dad ul haq Khan, Lecturer - Pashtoo Language
Abdul Muneer Rueen (He is also the founder of Teacher Rueen High Educational Center in Khairkhana, Kabul.)
Mehraban Saheb, Lecturer - Dari Language 
Laila Safi, Lecturer - Computer Science
Shukoor Khan, Lecturer - Islamic Religion (Olom Deeni)
Qadeer Khan, Lecturer - Chemistry
Abdulhakim Barkzai, Lecturer - Mathematics 
Zarghuna Jaan, Lecturer - English Language
Sajadullah Safi - newspaper manager

See also
Education in Afghanistan
List of schools in Kabul
Kabul

References

External links
 "A tale of hope in Kabul", Al Jazeera, 20 November 2010

Schools in Kabul